Vadim Vadimovich Sokolov (born 9 December 1971) is a retired Russian professional footballer who last worked as a manager of FC Gazprom transgaz Stavropol Ryzdvyany.

He made his professional debut in the Soviet Second League B in 1991 for FC Signal Izobilny.

References

1971 births
Living people
Sportspeople from Stavropol Krai
Soviet footballers
Russian footballers
Russian Premier League players
FC Dynamo Stavropol players
FC Zhemchuzhina Sochi players
FC Rubin Kazan players
FC Baltika Kaliningrad players
FC Luch Vladivostok players
FC Sokol Saratov players
Russian football managers
Association football midfielders
FC Spartak Kostroma players
FC Nosta Novotroitsk players